Smyshlyaev, Smyshliaev, Smyshlyayev, Smîşleaev, Şmîşleaev, Smâşleaev or Şmâşleaev is a Russian last name. Feminine variants of the same last name are Smyshlyaeva, Smyshliaeva, Smyshlyayeva, Smîşleaeva, Şmîşleaeva, Smâşleaeva or Şmâşleaeva.

People with this surname include:
 Alexandr Smyshlyaev, Russian freestyle skier
 Violeta Şmîşleaeva, wife of Marcel Pavel

References 

Russian-language surnames